Giuseppe Vittorio Raimondo Baudo (born 7 June 1936), known as Pippo Baudo, is one of the most famous Italian television presenters, with a career spanning six decades. He is often nicknamed "Superpippo" (referencing the Italian name of Super Goof). Baudo has also been the artistic director and president of the Teatro Stabile di Catania.

Career

Baudo was born in Militello in Val di Catania.  While studying law at the University of Catania, he became involved in entertainment as an actor and host.  He also learned to play the piano. He graduated with a degree in law, despite his interest in entertainment.  At the end of the 1950s, he became a singer and pianist for Orchestra Moonlight.  In 1959, for the first time,  Pippo appeared on Italian TV during a "Caravella dei Successi" episode, broadcast from Palermo.

He gained success hosting several RAI programmes, as well as serving as the artistic director. Pippo signed to Mediaset but has never been able to reclaim his past success.  He experienced a resurgence in his career when he hosted "Novecento" on RAI, which led to re-hosting the popular Sunday-afternoon show named "Domenica In" and the "Festival della canzone italiana".

In the 1970s, he helped establish and work for the Catania-based private channel "Antenna Sicilia".  In 1987, he hosted "Festival" on Mediaset after a controversy with RAI president, Enrico Manca.  However, years later he worked again for RAI; his show "Serata d'Onore" having been broadcast on Rai Due.

In the opening night of the Sanremo Music Festival 1995, shortly after the beginning of the show a man, Pino Pagano, sat on the edge of the gallery of the theater showing his intention to commit suicide by jumping below: he was eventually stopped by Baudo himself amid the applause of the audience.

In 1997, he signed again to Mediaset, but his shows "La canzone del secolo" and "Tiramisù" had very little success. In 1999, Baudo was asked by Rai Tre to host a new prime time program, "Giorno dopo Giorno", it is now called "Novecento".

In 2002, he hosted the Festival di Sanremo, after the 2001 edition had been a fiasco. He chose co-hosts Manuela Arcuri and Vittoria Belvedere.  He left RAI in 2004, but he came back in 2005, with the programme "Sabato Italiano", on Rai Uno. On 2 October 2005 he hosted for the eighth time the Sunday-afternoon program Domenica in (1979–1985, 1991–1992, 2005–2010).

In 2008, he hosted, for his thirteenth time, the Festival di Sanremo, succeeding Mike Bongiorno, who hosted eleven times.

Personal life
In 2004, Baudo and his wife, Italian soprano Katia Ricciarelli, divorced, who had been married since 1986. He has two children, Alessandro, born in 1962, who lives in Australia, and Tiziana, born in 1970 from his first wife.

Honour 
 : Knight Grand Cross of the Order of Merit of the Italian Republic (21 july 2021)

References

External links

1936 births
Living people
People from Militello in Val di Catania
Italian television presenters
Mass media people from Sicily
Knights Grand Cross of the Order of Merit of the Italian Republic